Bose Omolayo (born 1 February 1989) is a Nigerian powerlifter. She won the gold medal in the women's 79 kg event at the 2020 Summer Paralympics held in Tokyo, Japan. A few months later, she won the gold medal in her event at the 2021 World Para Powerlifting Championships held in Tbilisi, Georgia. At this event, she also set a new world record of 144 kg.

She competed in the women's +61 kg event at the 2014 Commonwealth Games where she won a silver medal. She competed at the games again in 2022 where she won a silver medal in the women's heavyweight event.

References

External links
 

1989 births
Living people
Nigerian female weightlifters
Commonwealth Games silver medallists for Nigeria
Female powerlifters
Commonwealth Games medallists in weightlifting
African Games gold medalists for Nigeria
African Games medalists in weightlifting
People from Igbuzo
Powerlifters at the 2014 Commonwealth Games
Competitors at the 2015 African Games
Powerlifters at the 2020 Summer Paralympics
Paralympic powerlifters of Nigeria
Nigerian powerlifters
Medalists at the 2020 Summer Paralympics
Paralympic gold medalists for Nigeria
Paralympic medalists in powerlifting
21st-century Nigerian women
Powerlifters at the 2022 Commonwealth Games
Commonwealth Games medallists in powerlifting
Medallists at the 2014 Commonwealth Games
Medallists at the 2022 Commonwealth Games